Avian (also Romanized as Āvīān and Avyān) is a village in Bala Velayat Rural District, Bala Velayat District, Bakharz County, Razavi Khorasan Province, Iran. At the 2006 census, its population was 782, in 176 families.

See also 

 List of cities, towns and villages in Razavi Khorasan Province

References 

Populated places in Bakharz County